Allan Vainola (also known as Al Vainola, birth name Allan Annus; born 11 March 1965, in Tartu)  is an Estonian singer, guitarist and composer. He is best known as the lead singer in such bands as Sõpruse Puiestee; Metro Luminal; Alumiinium, Sinu Sädelev Sõber; and as a guitarist in Vennaskond.

Vainola has also written music for several stageplays (e.g. "Ronja", "Huck", "Daamide õnn" and "Mort, surma õpilane"), and songs (e.g. "Riia mu arm", "Insener Garini hüperboloid", "Elagu Proudhon!", "Pille-Riin", "Subatlantiline kohtumine", "Eleegia", "1905" and "Kaks meest").

Allan Vainola is married to Estonian poet Kätlin Vainola who has also written songs for Sõpruse Puiestee and Vennaskond.

References

External links 
 

1965 births
Living people
Estonian composers
Anarcho-punk musicians
Punk rock musicians
Musicians from Tartu
21st-century Estonian male singers
Estonian rock guitarists
20th-century Estonian male singers